The Frameline Audience Award – Best Feature is an award of the San Francisco Frameline Film Festival. Since the festival's inception in 1984 the Best Feature Film has been awarded by the festival's audience selection.

Winners

References

American film awards
LGBT film awards